The Eagle Star Insurance Company plc (formerly Eagle Star Insurance Company Limited) was a leading British insurance business. It underwrote the full range of risks including liability, fire, accident, marine, motor, life, contingency and Pluvius (weather) insurance. It was listed on the London Stock Exchange and was a constituent of the FTSE 100 Index.

History

The Company was founded by Edward Mountain in 1904 as the British Dominions Marine Insurance Company, which operated as a marine insurance office in the five principal overseas Dominions. It started writing fire and accident policies in 1911 and life assurance policies in 1916.

It expanded rapidly in its early years acquiring the Eagle (founded by Sir William Rawlins in 1807) in 1916 and both the Sceptre (founded in 1864) and the Star (founded in 1843) in 1917. It was renamed the Eagle Star & British Dominions in 1917 and Eagle Star in 1937.

For many years its Head Office was at the prestigious address 1 Threadneedle Street, London EC2. However, a new administrative head office and computer centre was opened in Cheltenham in October 1968.

In 1981 it fought off a takeover bid from Allianz, the German insurance Group.

It was acquired by BAT Industries for £968m in 1984. It continued to trade, under the Eagle Star name, until acquisition by Zurich Financial Services in 1999.

In the 1980s, the company supported the Nature Conservatory and the Royal Society for the Protection of Birds in the successful reintroduction of sea eagles to Scotland.

See also
Eagle Star Staff Union
Syed, Isabel, Eagle Star  A guide to its history and archives, 1997
Splater, E.G., Box 1299, n/d 1950?

References

External links
 

Financial services companies established in 1904
Companies formerly listed on the London Stock Exchange
Insurance companies of the United Kingdom
1904 establishments in England
Financial services companies disestablished in 1984
Defunct companies of England
Companies based in Cheltenham
Zurich Insurance Group